Grégory Coelho (born 2 September 1999) is a French professional footballer who plays as rightback for Championnat National club Borgo on loan from Rodez.

Professional career
Coelho is a youth product of the academies of Cahors FC and Castelmaurou FC, before moving to Rodez AF. He debuted with Rodez's reserves in the Championnat National 3 in 2018. He made his professional debut for Rodez in a 2–1 Ligue 2 win over Caen on 13 December 2019. He signed his first professional contract with Rodez on 3 June 2020. On 3 August 2021, he joined Sète on loan for the 2021-22 season. On 29 January 2023, Coelho was loaned to Borgo.

Personal life
Born in France, Coelho is of Cape Verdean descent.

References

External links
 
 

1999 births
People from Cahors
Footballers from Le Mans
Living people
French footballers
French sportspeople of Cape Verdean descent
Association football fullbacks
Rodez AF players
FC Sète 34 players
FC Bastia-Borgo players
Ligue 2 players
Championnat National players
Championnat National 3 players